Gonnesa is a comune (municipality) in the Province of South Sardinia in the Italian region Sardinia, located about  west of Cagliari and about  northwest of Carbonia, in the Iglesiente subregion.

The town was refounded in the late 18th century by the local feudatory. During the 19th century its territory was affected by the resumption of mining which contributed significantly to its population growth .

In the Municipality of Gonnesa is located the mine of Nuraxi Figus, the last active coal mine in Italy today.

In its territory there is an important archaeological site, the nuraghe Seruci, and beach of almost  along which it is possible to surf, especially in a spot called Funtanamare. The other two spots are called Plag' 'e Mesu ("Middle Beach" in Sardinian language, and Porto Paglia.
Gonnesa borders the following municipalities: Carbonia, Iglesias, Portoscuso.

References

External links 

 pictures of Gonnesa

Cities and towns in Sardinia